The Cairo–Cape Town Highway is Trans-African Highway 4 in the transcontinental road network being developed by the United Nations Economic Commission for Africa (UNECA), the African Development Bank (AfDB), and the African Union.

The British Empire had long proposed a road through the Cape to Cairo Red Line of British colonies.
The road was variously known as the Cape to Cairo Road, Pan-African Highway, or, in sub-Saharan Africa, the Great North Road. Like the Cape to Cairo Railway, the road was not completed before the end of British colonal rule.

In the 1980s, a modified version of the plan was revived as part of the Trans-African Highway, a transcontinental road network developed by the United Nations Economic Commission for Africa (UNECA), the African Development Bank (ADB), and the African Union. While the Cairo-Cape Town Highway uses most of the same roads as the original Cape to Cairo Road, it uses different routes in a few places.

History
The original proposal for a North South Red Line route was made in 1874 by Edwin Arnold, then the editor of The Daily Telegraph, which was joint sponsor of the expedition by H.M. Stanley to Africa to discover the course of the Congo River. The proposed route involved a mixture of railway and river transport between Elizabethville, now Lubumbashi in the Belgian Congo and Sennar in the Sudan rather than a completely rail one.

In comparison, the Red Line road would stretch across the continent from south to north, running through the British colonies of the time, such as the Union of South Africa, Southern and Northern Rhodesia and Nyasaland, Kenya, Sudan and Egypt.  The road would create cohesion between the British colonies of Africa, it was thought, and give Britain the most important and dominant political and economic influence over the continent, securing its position as a global colonial power. The road would also link some of the most important cities on the continent, including Cape Town, Johannesburg, Pretoria, Harare (then Salisbury), Lusaka (the main street through the centre of Lusaka was part of this route and is how it got its name, Cairo Road), Nairobi, Khartoum and Cairo.  One of the main proponents of the route was Cecil John Rhodes, though his preference was for a railway. German East Africa (Tanganyika, now Tanzania) was a gap in the British territories, but Rhodes, in particular, felt that Germany ought to be a natural ally. Shortly before his death he had persuaded the German Kaiser to allow access through his colony for the Cape to Cairo telegraph line (which was built as far north as Ujiji but never completed). In 1918 Tanganyika became British and the gap in territories was filled.

One of the biggest problems was the decline of the Empire and fragmentation of the British colonies.  Even though Egypt became independent in 1922, British influence there was strong enough for Cairo to be viewed as part of the British sphere of interest, and the idea of a road continued. After Egypt, Sudan was the next to become independent in 1956, putting an end to the colonial motivation of the dream.

France had a rival strategy in the late 1890s to link its colonies from west to east across the continent, Senegal to Djibouti. Southern Sudan and Ethiopia were in the way, but France sent expeditions in 1897 to establish a protectorate in southern Sudan and to find a route across Ethiopia. The scheme foundered when a British flotilla on the Nile confronted the French expedition at the point of intersection between the French and British routes, leading to the Fashoda Incident and eventual diplomatic defeat for France.

The first known attempt to drive a vehicle from Cape Town to Cairo was by a Captain Kelsey in 1913-14 but this came to an untimely end when he was killed by a leopard in Rhodesia.  The first successful journey was Court Treatt expedition of 1924 led by Major Chaplin Court Treatt and described by his wife Stella Court Treatt in Cape to Cairo (1927), which drove two Crossley light trucks leaving Cape Town on 23 September 1924 and arriving in Cairo on 24 January 1926.

The modern revival of the plan occurred in the 1980s.  South Africa was not originally included in the route which was first planned in the Apartheid era, but it is now recognized that it would continue into that country. The consultants' report suggested Pretoria as end, which seems somewhat arbitrary and as a major port, Cape Town, is regarded as the southern end of regional highways in Southern African Development Community countries. The highway may be referred to in documents as the Cairo–Gaborone Highway or Cairo–Pretoria Highway.

Route

The stretch of highway between Dongola and Wadi Halfa in Northern Sudan and the Egypt-Sudan border are now accessible by road through the Qastal-Ashkeet border post.

Between Wad Madani in Sudan and Wereta in Ethiopia, the route is shared with the Ndjamena-Djibouti Highway. The Ethiopian section is all tarmac road, although much of the Ethiopian section passes through mountainous terrain and parts of the road may be hazardous as a result.

In northern Kenya the section has been hazardous due to the activities of armed bandits. The road has been dubbed "Hell's Road" by overland travellers, but it is completely paved. In Nairobi, the Cairo-Cape Town Highway intersects with the Lagos–Mombasa Highway.

The road section through Babati and Dodoma to Iringa in central Tanzania (the T2 Road) has been completely paved, and passable throughout most of the year.

Between Iringa in Tanzania and Kapiri Mposhi in Zambia via Tunduma & Mpika, the highway uses an important regional route, the Tanzam Highway. This highway used to have the distinction of being the only link between any of Africa's five major regions which is paved, linking East Africa to Southern Africa. It is the most used of any such inter-regional road on the continent. The Tanzanian section is designated as the T1 Road while the Zambian section is called the Great North Road (T2 Road).

From Kapiri Mposhi, the road is completely paved, mostly in good condition and continues southwards as the T2 Road (still called Great North Road), through Kabwe and Lusaka to the Kafue River Bridge, where it becomes the south-westerly Lusaka–Livingstone Road, through Mazabuka and Choma to Livingstone and the Victoria Falls, where the road crosses the Zambezi River and enters Zimbabwe. The section from Kapiri Mposhi to the beginning of the Lusaka-Livingstone Road south of Kafue is shared with the Beira-Lobito Highway.

The road section through Zimbabwe is paved, firstly going south-east from Victoria Falls to Bulawayo as the A8 Road, then shifting south-west as the A7 Road, crossing the border with Botswana after Plumtree (Ramokgwebana River), to the city of Francistown. The road section through Botswana is paved, going from the border with Zimbabwe as one road (the A1 Road) through Francistown, Palapye, Gaborone and Lobatse to the Ramatlabama border with South Africa.

In South Africa, the road is completely paved, first going south from the Ramatlabama Border through Mahikeng to Warrenton as the N18 Route, then from Warrenton through Kimberley to Beaufort West as the N12 Route, then from Beaufort West to Cape Town as the N1 Route. At Cape Town, it meets the southern terminus of the Tripoli–Cape Town Highway, where it ends.

Original route

The proposed route by the British Empire was known as the Cape to Cairo Road or the Pan-African Highway. In sub-Saharan Africa, it was also known as the Great North Road.

The Cairo–Cape Town Highway follows much of the route that makes up the proposed Cape to Cairo Road but it has a few differences. Firstly, the Cairo–Cape Town Highway passes through Addis Ababa, Ethiopia while the Cape-to-Cairo Road goes directly through South Sudan from Kenya. Secondly, in Tanzania, the Cairo–Cape Town Highway passes as the shortcut through Dodoma and Babati when travelling from Iringa to Arusha and not as the longer route through Chalinze. Thirdly, the Cairo–Cape Town Highway passes through Livingstone (Victoria Falls), Bulawayo, Francistown and Gaborone and not through Harare, Pretoria and Johannesburg.

Original route today

The most difficult section in the whole Cape to Cairo journey was across the Nubian Desert in northern Sudan between Atbara and Wadi Halfa, but this has been bypassed by a paved road on the west side of the Nile, Dongola to Abu Simbel Junction to Aswan.  Tarred highways continue the route to Cairo.

Through Ethiopia the route is tarred but some sections may have deteriorated severely. A paved road from Lake Tana to Gedaref takes the route into Sudan.

Kenya has a tarred highway to its border with Sudan but the roads in southern Sudan are very poor and made frequently impassable, so that even without the conflicts that have afflicted Sudan, the route through Ethiopia is generally preferred by overland travellers. Also, the border between Sudan and South Sudan was closed in 2011, expected to be reopened in 2022. The route from Isiolo in Kenya to Moyale on the Ethiopian border through the northern Kenyan desert has sometimes been dangerous due to bandits, but is now paved.

In Tanzania there are a number of roads could be deemed to be part of the route, the clear definitions and markings that are characteristic of the Pan-African Highway do not apply here. Most would consider it to be the road from Tunduma on the Tanzania-Zambia border, through Iringa and Morogoro to the Arusha turnoff at Chalinze, and north to Arusha (although there is now a shorter route from Iringa to Arusha through Dodoma and Babati), then to Nairobi in Kenya. This route is now all paved. There was a marker in the 1930s in Arusha, Tanzania, to indicate the midpoint of the road.

From Lusaka, Zambia's Great North Road continues the route to Tanzania as the T2 Road. (Also known as the Tanzam Highway and consisting of a right turn at Kapiri Mposhi towards Tanzania).

In Zimbabwe, the road continues from Beit Bridge as the Chirundu-Beitbridge Regional Road Corridor, which consists of the A4 road (R1 road) to Harare and the A1 road (R3 road) to Chirundu Border Post on the Zambezi River thereafter, continuing as the T2 Road in Zambia to Lusaka. An alternative route is the A6 and A8 roads, which connect the South African Border with the Zambian Border at Victoria Falls on the Zambezi River via Bulawayo. The alternative route continues as the T1 Road in Zambia towards Lusaka.

Starting from the south, the first section of the road that runs through South Africa is called the N1, linking Cape Town in the south with Beit Bridge on the Limpopo River between South Africa and Zimbabwe. It passes through Johannesburg and Pretoria. There are numerous alternative routes in South Africa.

See also

 Trans-African Highway network
 Lagos-Mombasa Highway

References

 African Development Bank/United Nations Economic Commission For Africa: "Review of the Implementation Status of the Trans African Highways and the Missing Links: Volume 2: Description of Corridors". 14 August 2003. Retrieved 14 July 2007.
 Michelin Motoring and Tourist Map: "Africa North and West". Michelin Travel Publications, Paris, 2000.

4
British Empire
Road transport in Africa